The Timothy Reed House is a historic house at 284 Adams Street in Quincy, Massachusetts.  This two-story wood-frame house was built in the 1870s by Timothy Reed, a Boston-based leather merchant.  It is the city's finest Stick style house, with bargeboard gable decoration, and alternating sections of horizontal and vertical siding, set off by trim bands.  Its gable ends are truncated, the eaves are lined with brackets, and the front porch has a low turned balustrade and posts with large brackets.

The house was listed on the National Register of Historic Places in 1989.

See also
National Register of Historic Places listings in Quincy, Massachusetts

References

Houses in Quincy, Massachusetts
Queen Anne architecture in Massachusetts
Houses completed in 1875
National Register of Historic Places in Quincy, Massachusetts
Houses on the National Register of Historic Places in Norfolk County, Massachusetts